Readymoney or Ready Money may refer to:

Readymoney Cove - a beach and settlement near Fowey, Cornwall, UK
Ready Money (film), a 1914 film
Ready Money Creek, a stream in Alaska

People with the surname Readymoney
Cowasji Jehangir Readymoney - a community leader, philanthropist and industrialist of Bombay, India
Jehangir Cowasji Jehangir Readymoney - the son of Cowasji Jehangir Readymoney